Cadmoindite (CdIn2S4) is a rare cadmium indium sulfide mineral discovered in Siberia around the vent of a high-temperature (450–600 °C) fumarole at the Kudriavy volcano, Iturup Island in the Kuril Islands. It has also been reported from the Kateřina Coal Mine in Bohemia, Czech Republic.

Crystal Structure
CdIn2S4 exhibits the spinel structure, which can be described by a cubic unit cell with 8 tetrahedrally coordinated and 16 tetrahedrally coordinated cation sites. The distribution of Cd(II) and In(III) over the cation sites is difficult to elucidate from standard X-Ray Diffraction techniques because the two species are isoelectronic, but both Raman spectroscopy measurements on synthetic samples and density functional theory simulations  indicate that about 20% of the tetrahedral sites are occupied by In(III) cations.

References

Cadmium minerals
Indium minerals
Thiospinel group
Cubic minerals
Minerals in space group 227
Minerals described in 2004